Powelliphanta rossiana, known as Ross' land snail, is a species of large, carnivorous land snail, a terrestrial pulmonate gastropod mollusc in the family Rhytididae. This species is endemic to the South Island of New Zealand. Subspecies include:
Powelliphanta rossiana fletcheri Powell, 1938 – Range Restricted 
Powelliphanta rossiana, subspecies "Fox" 
Powelliphanta rossiana gagei Powell, 1938 – Nationally Critical 
Powelliphanta rossiana rossiana Powell, 1930

The eggs are oval and seldom constant in dimensions 8 × 6.75, 6.5 × 5.75, 8.25 × 6.75 mm.

References

Powelliphanta
Gastropods of New Zealand
Gastropods described in 1930
Taxobox binomials not recognized by IUCN
Taxa named by Arthur William Baden Powell
Endemic molluscs of New Zealand
Endemic fauna of New Zealand